Babolqani (also Romanized as Bābolqānī; also known as Bābalghani, Bābā Qolī, Babol Ghani, Bābolghānī, and Qal‘eh-ye Bābā Khān) is a village in Jowzan Rural District, in the Central District of Malayer County, Hamadan Province, Iran. At the 2006 census, its population was 1,313, in 332 families and they speak in lurish language.

References 

Populated places in Malayer County